Greenwich Bay, is a bay on the coast of Rhode Island in the United States near Warwick, RI and East Greenwich, Rhode Island off of Narragansett Bay.

The United States Navy seaplane tender USS Greenwich Bay, in commission from 1945 to 1966, was named for the bay.

Notes

References
 (See ship namesake paragraph.)

Bays of Rhode Island
East Greenwich, Rhode Island
Landforms of Kent County, Rhode Island
Narragansett Bay